Two's Missing is a compilation album by English rock band The Who.

Album content
Released in 1987 on vinyl, cassette and CD, Two's Missing gathered singles and EP tracks that hadn't appeared on album or CD. The album cover design is by Richard Evans.

Reissues
The album was reissued on CD in Japan as a limited edition release on 24 December 2011 with 4 additional tracks carried over from the Japan-only bonus CD of Then and Now, as a two-CD set together with Who's Missing. Two's Missing was remastered by Jon Astley.

Track listing

References

Albums produced by Glyn Johns
Albums produced by Kit Lambert
Albums produced by Shel Talmy
The Who compilation albums
B-side compilation albums
1987 compilation albums
MCA Records compilation albums
Tommy (rock opera)